The following are the association football events of the year 2009 throughout the world.

News

General 
Major League Soccer (United States/Canada) expands to 15 teams with the launch of Seattle Sounders FC.
Women's Professional Soccer, the successor to the defunct Women's United Soccer Association in the US, launched in March with 7 teams.
During the 2009–10 A-League season, the FFA, the governing body of the sport in Australia, will expand the 8 team A-League to include 10 teams, with the addition of clubs from North Queensland and the Gold Coast.

January 
 1 – Gamba Osaka win the 88th edition of the Emperor's Cup and qualify for the 2009 AFC Champions League.
 11 – Club Deportivo Guadalajara win the InterLiga 2009, Guadalajara and runners-up C.F. Pachuca both qualify for the Copa Libertadores.
 12 – The 2008 FIFA World Player of the Year ceremony took place in Zürich, Switzerland. Cristiano Ronaldo was awarded the men's prize and Marta won the women's prize for the third consecutive year.
 13 – Uganda win their tenth CECAFA Cup, beating Kenya 1–0 in the final at the National Stadium, Kampala.
 17 – Oman win the 19th Arabian Gulf Cup, beating Saudi Arabia, 6–5 on penalties.

February 
23 – K-League 2008 champions Suwon Samsung Bluewings defeat MLS representative Los Angeles Galaxy at the final game of Pan-Pacific Championship 2009 by penalty shootout after 1–1 game, winning the second champion title of Pan-Pacific Championship. J. League Cup 2008 winners Oita Trinita win the third place match against Chinese Super League 2008 champions Shandong Luneng Taishan, 2–1.
 28 – Melbourne Victory win the grand final of the 2008–09 A-League season.

March
 14 – In the Premier League, Liverpool beat Manchester United 4–1 at Old Trafford, completing a "double" against both Manchester United and Chelsea this season.

May
 2 - Barcelona beat Real Madrid 2–6 at Santiago Bernabeu Stadium.
 25 – Burnley beat Sheffield United 1–0 at Wembley Stadium in the second tier of English football's play-off final and are promoted to the top flight.
 27 - Barcelona beat Manchester United 2–0 at Stadio Olimpico in Rome, winning their 3rd Champions League title.

June
 6 – Japan, Australia, South Korea, and Netherlands are officially qualified for the 2010 FIFA World Cup.
 17 – North Korea is qualified for the 2010 FIFA World Cup.
 28 – Brazil beats the USA 3–2 at the final of the FIFA Confederations Cup 2009 in Johannesburg, South Africa, winning two consecutive FIFA Confederations Cup titles.

July
 9 – Liga Deportiva Universitaria de Quito beats SC Internacional 4–0 on aggregate at the 2009 Recopa Sudamericana.
 26 – Players from the 1990 England and West Germany national teams are to replay their Italia '90 World Cup semi-final match in aid of charity, for the Sir Bobby Robson Trophy.
 28 – Former Ipswich, Newcastle, England and Barcelona manager Bobby Robson dies at age 76.

September
 3 – Romanian goalkeeper Alexandru Iatan of Dunărea Giurgiu died while training penalty shots when the ball hit his chest.
10 – The International Federation of Football History & Statistics, an organization recognized by FIFA, has published a continental Clubs of 20th Century ranking.
27 – HB Tórshavn beat the Faroese league for the 20th time. The first club on the islands to reach this milestone.

October
 27 - 3rd tier side Alcorcón beat 4-0 La Liga side Real Madrid in a Spanish cup match. This match was given the name Alcorconazo by the Spanish media and by Alcorcón fans.

November
 14 – New Zealand beats Bahrain 1–0 on aggregate at the AFC–OFC play-off. The All Whites book their first World Cup trip since 1982, while Bahrain lose for the second straight time in an inter-confederation play-off, having lost to Trinidad and Tobago in 2006.
 18 – Controversies over Republic of Ireland vs France match, one of the 2010 FIFA World Cup qualification – UEFA Second Round play-offs, occur due to France's play-off-winning goal in connection with intentional handball by French captain Thierry Henry.
 18 – Uruguay beats Costa Rica 2–1 on aggregate at the CONCACAF–CONMEBOL play-off, making themselves the last of 32 countries qualifying for the 2010 FIFA World Cup.

December
 2 - Liga Deportiva Universitaria de Quito beats Fluminense FC 5–4 on aggregate at the 2009 Copa Sudamericana finals.
 4 – The final draw for 2010 FIFA World Cup is held in Cape Town, South Africa.
 19 – FC Barcelona beats Estudiantes de La Plata 2–1 in the final match of the 2009 FIFA Club World Cup.
 21 – The 2009 FIFA World Player of the Year awards are handed out in Zürich. The men's award goes to Lionel Messi of Argentina and FC Barcelona. The women's award goes to Marta of Brazil and the Los Angeles Sol, who becomes the first player of either sex to win the award four times (in her case, consecutively).

Events

Men's national teams

CAF
 31 December 2008 – 13 January 2009: 2008 CECAFA Cup in 
  
  
  
 4th 
 28 November–13 December: 2009 CECAFA Cup in 
  
  
  
 4th

AFC
 4–17 January: 19th Arabian Gulf Cup in 
  
  
  /

CONCACAF
 3–26 July: 2009 CONCACAF Gold Cup in the 
  
  
  ,

FIFA
 14–28 June: FIFA Confederations Cup 2009 in 
  
  
  
 4th 
 24 September – 16 October: 2009 FIFA U-20 World Cup in 
  
  
  
 4th 
 24 October – 15 November: 2009 FIFA U-17 World Cup in 
  
  
  
 4th

Club football

Women

National champions

AFC
 – Melbourne Victory
 – Muharraq Club
 – Abahani Limited
 – Druk Star
 – a Corp
 – Beijing Guoan
 – Kaohsiung City Yaoti
 – Quality Distributors
 – South China AA
 – Churchill Brothers
 – Persipura Jayapura
 – Esteghlal
 – Arbil FC
 – Kashima Antlers
 – Al-Wahdat
 – Jeonbuk Hyundai Motors
 – Al-Qadisiya Kuwait
 – Dordoi-Dynamo
 – Nejmeh
 – Lam Pak
 – Selangor FA
 – Al-Nahda
 – WAPDA
 – Wadi Al-Nes
 – Al-Gharrafa
 – Al-Ittihad
 – SAFFC
 – Al-Karamah
 – Vakhsh Qurghonteppa
 – Muang Thong United
 – HTTU Aşgabat
 – Al-Ahli
 – Bunyodkor
 – Đà Nẵng

CAF
 – ES Sétif
 – Tiko United
 – Al Ahly
 – Al-Ittihad
 – Raja Casablanca
 – Bayelsa United
 – Supersport United
 – Espérance Sportive de Tunis

CONCACAF
 : Mexican Primera División – UNAM (C); Monterrey (A)
 
Major League Soccer (USA/Canada) – Real Salt Lake (P) / Columbus Crew (L)
 Women's Professional Soccer (USA) – Sky Blue FC
Note: "(A)" means Apertura champion; "(C)" mean Clausura champion.
Note: "(P)" designates the MLS Cup playoffs champion; "(L)" designates the MLS Supporters' Shield winner.

CONMEBOL
: – Vélez Sársfield (C); Banfield (A)
: – Bolívar (A); Blooming (C)
: – Flamengo
: – Universidad de Chile (A); Colo-Colo (C)
: – Once Caldas (A); Independiente Medellín (C)
: – Deportivo Quito
: – Cerro Porteño (A); Nacional (C)
: – Universitario de Deportes
: – Nacional
: – Caracas

Note: "(A)" means Apertura champion; "(C)" mean Clausura champion.

OFC
 – Lakota
French Polynesia – Manu-Ura
New Caledonia – Magenta
 – Auckland City
 – Tafea FC

UEFA
 Albania – Tirana
 Andorra – Sant Julià
 Armenia – Pyunik
 Austria – Red Bull Salzburg
 Azerbaijan – Baku
 Belarus – BATE Borisov
 Belgium – Standard Liège
 Bosnia and Herzegovina – Zrinjski Mostar
 Bulgaria – Levski Sofia
 Croatia – Dinamo Zagreb
 Cyprus – APOEL
 Czech Republic – Slavia Prague
 Denmark – Copenhagen
 England – Manchester United
 Estonia – Levadia
 Faroe Islands – HB Tórshavn
 Finland – HJK Helsinki
 France – Bordeaux
 Georgia – WIT Georgia
 Germany – Wolfsburg
 Greece – Olympiacos
 Hungary – Debrecen
 Iceland – FH
 Republic of Ireland – Bohemians
 Israel – Maccabi Haifa
 Italy – Internazionale
 Kazakhstan – FC Aktobe
 Latvia – FK Liepājas Metalurgs
 Lithuania – FK Ekranas
 Luxembourg – F91 Dudelange
 Macedonia – Makedonija Gjorče Petrov
 Malta – Hibernians
 Moldova – Sheriff Tiraspol
 Montenegro – Mogren
 Netherlands – AZ
 Northern Ireland – Glentoran
 Norway – Rosenborg
 Poland – Wisła Kraków
 Portugal – Porto
 Romania – Unirea Urziceni
 Russia – Rubin Kazan
 San Marino – Tre Fiori
 Scotland – Rangers
 Serbia – Partizan
 Slovakia – Slovan Bratislava
 Slovenia – Maribor
 Spain – Barcelona
 Sweden – AIK
 Switzerland – Zürich
 Turkey – Beşiktaş
 Ukraine – Dynamo Kyiv
 Wales – Rhyl

Deaths

January 
 2 January – Ian Greaves (76), English defender and manager
 2 January – Ryuzo Hiraki (77), Japanese defender and national team manager
 2 January – Kamel Karia (58), Tunisian goalkeeper
 4 January – Lei Clijsters (52), Belgian defender and coach, father of Kim Clijsters
 4 January – Arvid Knutsen (80), Norwegian forward and coach
 5 January – Jimmy Rayner (73), English striker
 6 January – Shmuel Ben Dror (84), Israeli midfielder, scorer of the first ever goal of the Israel national football team
 6 January – Charlie Thomson (78), Scottish goalkeeper
 7 January – Alfie Conn, Sr. (82), Scottish forward
 8 January – Alberto Eliani (86), Italian defender
 9 January – Victor Mosa (63), Italian/French defender
 10 January – Jack Wheeler (89), English goalkeeper
 12 January – Friaça, Brazilian forward, runner-up at the 1950 FIFA World Cup. (84)
 13 January – Tommy Casey (78), Northern Irish midfielder
 14 January – Tomi Jalo (50), Finnish midfielder
 16 January – Cláudio Milar (35), Uruguayan striker, traffic accident
 17 January – Tomislav Crnković (79), Croatian defender
 19 January – Joop Wille (88), Dutch goalkeeper
 20 January – Johnny Dixon (85), English striker
 21 January – Jaime Belmonte (74), Mexican midfielder, participated in the 1958 FIFA World Cup
 21 January – Vic Crowe (76), Welsh midfielder
 21 January – Peter Persidis (61), Austrian defender
 22 January – Clément Pinault (23), French defender, heart attack
 24 January – Fernando Cornejo (39), Chilean midfielder, cancer
 24 January – Karl Koller (79), Austrian midfielder
 26 January – Ivan Jensen (76), Danish midfielder
 27 January – Aubrey Powell (90), Welsh forward
 29 January – Willi Köchling (75), German defender
 29 January – Roy Saunders (78), English midfielder
 30 January – Pieter Van Den Bosch (71), Belgian midfielder, participated in the 1954 FIFA World Cup

February 
 2 February – Paul Birch (46), English midfielder
 7 February – Joe Haverty (72), Irish midfielder
 8 February – Jouni Jalonen (66), Finnish defender, Finnish Footballer of the Year in 1968
 9 February – Reg Davies (79), Welsh forward
 9 February – Neville Hamilton (48), English midfielder
 10 February – Holger Olsen (88), Danish defender
 12 February – Giacomo Bulgarelli (68), Italian midfielder, participated in the 1962 FIFA World Cup, 1966 FIFA World Cup and UEFA Euro 1968
 13 February – Jerzy Hawrylewicz (50), Polish forward
 15 February – Don Leeson (73), English goalkeeper
 20 February – Július Nôta (37), Slovak goalkeeper, stabbing

March 
 1 March – Elefterios Manolios (73), French goalkeeper
 2 March – Andy Bowman (74), Scottish midfielder
 2 March – Carlos Sosa (89), Argentine defender
 3 March – Åke Lindman (81), Finnish defender
 3 March – José Moncebáez (80), Mexican goalkeeper and national team coach
 4 March – Harry Parkes (89), English defender
 5 March – Valeri Broshin (46), Russian midfielder
 7 March – Jimmy Hernon (84), Scottish midfielder
 7 March – Edouard Oum Ndeki (32), Cameroonian midfielder, hepatitis
 7 March – Anton Shokh (49), Kazakhstani-Russian midfielder
 9 March – Eddie Lowe (83), English midfielder
 10 March – Jack Capper (77), Welsh defender
 12 March – Ferenc Szabó, (88) Hungarian footballer 
 15 March – Jumadi Abdi, (36) Indonesian footballer 
 16 March – Alan Suddick (64), English midfielder
 28 March – Hugh Kelly (85), Scottish defender
 29 March – Vladimir Fedotov (66), Russian striker
 31 March – Enea Masiero (75), Italian midfielder

April 
 2 April – Víctor Hugo Ávalos (37), Paraguayan midfielder
 6 April – Gheorghe Ene (72), Romanian striker
 11 April – Jimmy Neighbour (58), English midfielder
 12 April – Mike Keen (69), English midfielder
 12 April – Louis Leysen (76), Belgian goalkeeper
 13 April – Miguel Ángel Mori (65), Argentine midfielder, participated in the 1964 Summer Olympics
 19 April – Maurilio Prini (76), Italian midfielder
 19 April – Dicky Robinson (82), English defender
 19 April – Brian Tyrrell (-), Irish football forward
 20 April – Franco Rotella (42), Italian midfielder
 23 April – Lam Sheung Yee (74), Hong Kong defender
 25 April – Miljenko Bajić (54), Bosnian defender

May 
 1 May – Jokke Kangaskorpi (37), Finnish forward
 3 May – John Elsworthy (77), Welsh midfielder, member of the squad for the 1958 FIFA World Cup
 3 May – Tommy Fowler (84), English midfielder
 4 May – Bobby Campbell (86), Scottish winger
 9 May – Juan Gómez (84), Mexican defender, participated in the 1954 FIFA World Cup
 13 May – Norbert Eschmann (75), Swiss-French midfielder, member of the squad for the 1954 FIFA World Cup and 1962 FIFA World Cup
 14 May – Ken Hollyman, Welsh footballer (86)
 16 May – Peter Sampson, English footballer (81)
 19 May – Andrei Ivanov (42), Russian defender
 19 May – Knut Hammer Larsen, Norwegian footballer (38)
 20 May – Alan Kelly Sr., Irish footballer (72)
 21 May – Walter da Silva, Brazilian footballer (67)
 21 May – Anatoli Kirilov, Bulgarian footballer
 24 May – Youssef Elbai (30), French defender
 25 May – Billy Baxter (70), Scottish midfielder/defender
 27 May – Ammo Baba, Iraqi footballer (74)
 28 May – Ercole Rabitti, Italian footballer (87)
 30 May – Alexander Obregón, Colombian footballer (31)
 30 May – Gunnar Arnesen (81), Norwegian forward

June 
 2 June – Rodrigo García Vizoso (100), Spanish goalkeeper and coach
 4 June – Lev Brovarskyi (60), Ukrainian midfielder
 6 June – Bobby Haarms (74), Dutch midfielder
 7 June – Willie Kilmarnock (87), Scottish footballer
 7 June – Gordon Lennon (26), Northern Irish defender, traffic accident
 8 June – Aage Rou Jensen (84), Danish striker
 10 June – Stelios Skevofilakas (69), Greek footballer
 11 June – Alan Philpott (66), English midfielder
 14 June – Abel Tador (24), Nigerian footballer
 17 June – Shacky Tauro (49, Zimbabwean footballer
 18 June – Mihai Mocanu (67), Romanian defender, participated in the 1970 FIFA World Cup
 20 June – Joseph Ibanez (82), French midfielder and coach
 23 June – Jackie Swindells (72), English striker
 24 June – Mario Tontodonati (85), Italian midfielder/forward

July 
 2 July – Kaj Hansen (68), Swedish defender, participated in the 1964 European Nations' Cup
 3 July – Sadek Boukhalfa (74), Algerian midfielder
 6 July – Mihai Baicu (33), Romanian midfielder, cardiac arrest
 12 July – Tommy Cummings (80), English midfielder and manager
 13 July – Axel Pilmark (83), Danish midfielder, participated in the 1948 Summer Olympics
 14 July – Kujtim Majaci (47), Albanian forward
 17 July – Otto Bresling (88), Danish midfielder
 20 July – Sargis Aroyan (18), Armenian forward
 21 July – Dai Lawrence (62), Welsh defender
 24 July – Zé Carlos (47), Brazilian goalkeeper
 25 July – Ricardo Bonelli (76), Argentine midfielder
 25 July – Italo Romagnoli (93), Italian defender
 25 July – Zequinha (74), Brazilian midfielder, on the squad for the 1962 FIFA World Cup
 29 July – Paul McGrillen (37), Scottish striker, suicide
 30 July – Yuri Kurnenin (55), Belarusian midfielder and manager
 31 July – Sir Bobby Robson (76), English forward and manager

August 
2 August – Joe Livingstone (67), English striker
5 August – Mario Tiddia (73), Italian defender and manager
8 August – Daniel Jarque (26), Spanish defender, heart attack
8 August – Orlando Rozzoni (72), Italian forward
9 August – Tommy Clinton (83), Irish defender
9 August – Massimiliano Fiondella (41), Italian defender
10 August – Francisco Valdés (66), Chilean midfielder
11 August – Lazare Gianessi (83), French defender, participated in the 1954 FIFA World Cup
11 August – Jan Sillo, (32) South African footballer
13 August – Brian McLaughlin (54), Scottish midfielder
19 August – Vic Snell (81), English defender
19 August – Bobby Thomson (65), English defender and manager
24 August – Virginio De Paoli (71), Italian striker
31 August – Torsten Lindberg (92), Swedish goalkeeper and manager, participated in the 1948 Summer Olympics and 1950 FIFA World Cup

September
1 September – Jock Buchanan (74), Scottish forward
7 September – Norman Curtis, (84), English footballer
9 September – Léon Glovacki (81), French striker and manager, participated in the 1954 FIFA World Cup
11 September – Carlo De Bernardi (56), Italian midfielder
11 September – Jean-François Prigent (65), French midfielder
11 September – Henny van Schoonhoven (39), Dutch defender, cancer
13 September – Paul Shirtliff (46), English defender
19 September – Stevie Gray (42), English footballer
19 September – Brian Filipi (20), Albanian midfielder, traffic accident
20 September – Hernan Córdoba, (19) Colombian footballer
20 September – Mario Beltrán (23), Colombian midfielder, traffic accident
20 September – Hernan Córdoba (19), Colombian striker, traffic accident
22 September – Marco Achilli (60), Italian midfielder
23 September – Dennis Pacey, (80), English footballer
24 September – Terry Bly (73), English striker and manager
26 September – Geoff Barrowcliffe (77), English defender
27 September – René Bliard (76), French striker
27 September – Raúl Savoy (68), Argentine midfielder
28 September – Horst Feilzer (52), German forward
28 September – Best Ogedegbe, (55), Nigerian footballer
30 September – Raúl Magaña (69), Salvadoran goalkeeper and manager

October
1 October – Mangue Cissé (60), Ivorian defender, father of Djibril Cissé
2 October – Rolf Rüssmann (58), German defender, participated in the 1978 FIFA World Cup
3 October – Zoran Mijucić (40), Serbian midfielder, participated in the 1987 FIFA World Youth Championship
4 October – Gerhard Kaufhold (80), German midfielder/striker
5 October – Tommy Capel (87), English forward
8 October – Alex McCrae (89), Scottish forward
9 October – Arne Bakker (79), Norwegian midfielder
9 October – Horst Szymaniak (75), German midfielder, participated in the 1958 FIFA World Cup and the 1962 FIFA World Cup
11 October – Gustav Kral (26), Austrian goalkeeper, traffic accident
12 October – Massimo Mattolini (56), Italian goalkeeper
12 October – Stan Palk, (87), English footballer
13 October – Orane Simpson (26), Jamaican midfielder, stabbing
15 October – Heinz Versteeg, (70), Dutch footballer
17 October – David Burnside (69), English midfielder and manager
21 October – John Jarman (78), Welsh midfielder
22 October – Ray Lambert, (87) Welsh footballer
22 October – Albert Watson, (91) English footballer
23 October – Collins Mbulo (38), Zambian goalkeeper
27 October – Frank Brady, Jr. (age unknown), Irish midfielder
 30 October – Juvenal, Brazilian defender, runner-up at the 1950 FIFA World Cup. (85)
30 October – František Veselý (65), Czech forward, participated in the 1970 FIFA World Cup and the UEFA Euro 1976

November
2 November – Keith Kettleborough (74), English midfielder
2 November – Paolo Perugi (44), Italian midfielder
3 November – Archie Baird, (90), Scottish footballer
4 November – Stefano Chiodi (52), Italian midfielder
7 November – Billy Ingham (57), English midfielder
10 November – Robert Enke (32), German goalkeeper, suicide
12 November – Willy Kernen, (80), Swiss footballer
13 November – Héctor Facundo (72), Argentine midfielder, participated in the 1962 FIFA World Cup
15 November – Ray Charnley (74), English forward
15 November – Don Martin (65), English forward
16 November – Antonio de Nigris (31), Mexican striker, heart attack
18 November – Salem Saad (31), Emirati striker, heart attack
19 November – Frank Beattie (76), Scottish footballer
22 November – Juan Carlos Muñoz (90), Argentine midfielder
23 November – Tony Parry (64), English defender
25 November – Mike Tiddy (80), English midfielder
26 November – Giuseppe Baldini (87), Italian striker and manager
26 November – Nikola Kovachev, (75), Bulgarian footballer
29 November – George Cummins (78), Irish forward
30 November – Christoph Budde (46), German striker

December
December – Henry Andersson (85), Swedish goalkeeper
1 December – Neil Dougall (88), Scottish midfielder and manager
1 December – Alberto Martínez (59), Uruguayan midfielder
1 December – Christoph Budde, German footballer (46)
12 December – Manuel Ruiz Sosa (72), Spanish midfielder and manager
13 December – Wilton Cezar Xavier (62) Brazilian footballer
14 December – Alan A'Court (75), English midfielder and manager, participated in the 1958 FIFA World Cup
16 December – Dennis Herod, (86) English footballer
17 December – Michel Leblond (77), French midfielder and manager, on the squad for the 1954 FIFA World Cup
17 December – Guillermo Ortíz (69), Mexican midfielder, on the squad for the 1962 FIFA World Cup
17 December – Miljenko Mihić, (75) Serbian football coach
20 December – Jack Brownsword (86), English defender
22 December – Albert Scanlon (74), English forward, survivor of the Munich air disaster
24 December – Hugo Berly (67), Chilean defender, on the squad for the 1966 FIFA World Cup
26 December – Giuseppe Chiappella (85), Italian midfielder and manager
27 December – Takashi Takabayashi, (78), Japan footballer
28 December – Allen Batsford (77), English football manager

Clubs founded
 RB Leipzig

References

 
Association football by year